Michael Charles Aljoe (born March 7, 1964) is an American bobsledder. He competed in the two man event at the 1988 Winter Olympics.

He attended Lewisville High School and later the University of Oklahoma.

References

External links
 

1964 births
Living people
American male bobsledders
Olympic bobsledders of the United States
Bobsledders at the 1988 Winter Olympics
Sportspeople from Buffalo, New York